Hitomi Koshimizu (born 24 May 1960) is a Japanese luger. She competed at the 1984 Winter Olympics and the 1988 Winter Olympics.

References

External links
 

1960 births
Living people
Japanese female lugers
Olympic lugers of Japan
Lugers at the 1984 Winter Olympics
Lugers at the 1988 Winter Olympics
Sportspeople from Hokkaido